Jacobs Island is a narrow island  long between the Hellerman Rocks and Laggard Island, off the southwest coast of Anvers Island, Antarctica. It was named by the Advisory Committee on Antarctic Names for U.S. Navy Lieutenant Commander Paul F. Jacobs, Officer-in-Charge of Palmer Station in 1972.

See also 
 List of Antarctic and subantarctic islands

References

Islands of the Palmer Archipelago